The Seattle Mitre Eagles were an American soccer club based in Port Orchard, Washington. The club is notable for making the finals of the 1987 U.S. Open Cup, and participating in the 1988 CONCACAF Champions' Cup where they lost to Mexico's Cruz Azul 9-0 on aggregate. The Eagles held Cruz Azul to a 0-0 draw in the second leg of that tie.

History
The origin of the club is unknown, but it is likely that the team formed in the mid-1980s. The founders of the team were former University of Washington students, and ex-players who played for FC Seattle Storm.

Honors
U.S. Open Cup Runners-up (1): 1987
Participations in CONCACAF Champions' Cup: 1988

References 

Soccer clubs in Seattle
Soccer clubs in Washington (state)
U.S. clubs in CONCACAF Champions' Cup
Defunct soccer clubs in Washington (state)